Gayton Road railway station was a station in Norfolk, located close to King's Lynn on the Midland and Great Northern Joint Railway.

History

The station opened on 1 July 1887. It was closed on 2 March 1959.

The station platforms remain intact as of May 2021.

See also
 Railways in Norfolk

References

Disused railway stations in Norfolk
Former Midland and Great Northern Joint Railway stations
Railway stations in Great Britain opened in 1887
Railway stations in Great Britain closed in 1959